Sergeyevskoye is a rural locality (a settlement) in Komsomolskoye Rural Settlement, Ramonsky District, Voronezh Oblast, Russia. The population was 59 as of 2010. There are 2 streets.

Geography 
Sergeyevskoye is located 19 km northwest of Ramon (the district's administrative centre) by road. Komsomolsky is the nearest rural locality.

References 

Rural localities in Ramonsky District